All India Progressive Janata Dal (formerly All India Janata Dal), was a political party in India. AIJD was launched on 11 December 2002, by several leaders of Janata Dal (Secular) and Janata Dal (United) in Karnataka, including the main JD(U) leader in the state Ramakrishna Hegde and JD(S) leader S. R. Bommai.

AIJD president was former Union minister S. R. Bommai (coming from JD(S)) and vice-president was Rajya Sabha member Vijay Mallya (previously vice-president of JD(U)).

C. M. Ibrahim was also the National President for a brief period

References

Defunct political parties in India
Political parties established in 2002
2002 establishments in India
Political parties with year of disestablishment missing